Carlos Joseph Condit (born April 26, 1984) is an American former professional mixed martial artist. He formerly competed in the Welterweight division in the Ultimate Fighting Championship (UFC), where he was the former Interim UFC Welterweight Champion. Condit formerly fought in the UFC's sister promotion, World Extreme Cagefighting (WEC), where he was the final Welterweight Champion. Condit has also competed for both Shootboxing and Pancrase in Japan.

Condit has launched business ventures, including a coffee shop and a line of custom jeans with Los Angeles brand Sene.

Background
Condit was born on April 26, 1984, in Albuquerque, New Mexico, and is of Austrian, German, Native American, and Mexican descent. Condit's father, Brian, was the Chief of Staff for former New Mexico governor and Democratic presidential candidate Bill Richardson. Condit attended Cibola High School on Albuquerque's West Side. He began wrestling at the age of nine and continued throughout high school, and started training in Gaidojutsu under Greg Jackson at fifteen.

Mixed martial arts career

Early career (2002–2006)
Condit turned professional at eighteen years old, taking less than a minute to submit Nick Roscorta with a rear-naked choke in his debut in Juárez, Mexico on September 6, 2002. He also won his next four fights in the first round, with only one going past the one-minute mark, before tasting defeat for the first time, albeit under the shoot boxing ruleset, in his international debut. He faced off with ninety-five fight veteran and Shoot Boxing World Tournament 2002 champion Andy Souwer in Tokyo, Japan on September 23, 2003, losing by technical knockout due to leg kicks with seventeen seconds left of the fight after being knocked down three times in the fifth and final round.

Returning to MMA, Condit continued his impressive run of form in the sport with a further three first round stoppage wins to go 8–0 before he was submitted with a Carlo Prater triangle choke inside the opening round in Albuquerque on September 11, 2004. He rebounded from the loss with a four fight win streak and returned to Japan to fight in Pancrase, losing to Satoru Kitaoka via first round heel hook submission at Pancrase: Spiral 8 in Yokohama on October 2, 2005. Following this, he had a stint in the Hawaii-based Rumble on the Rock promotion and defeated Ross Ebañez via TKO in his promotional debut before going on to compete in the ROTR Welterweight Tournament. The tournament's quarter-finals were held on January 20, 2006, at Rumble on the Rock 8 where Condit recorded a seventeen-second TKO stoppage of Renato Verissimo. The semis and the final both took place on the same night, April 21, 2006, at Rumble on the Rock 9 and Condit submitted Frank Trigg with a triangle armbar to book his place in the final against Jake Shields. Going the distance for the first time in his career, Condit lost by unanimous decision.

Condit suffered a second consecutive loss in his next outing, submitting to a Pat Healy rear-naked choke in round three of their contest in Oakland, California, before making a return to Pancrase and defeating Koji Oishi via TKO in his sophomore appearance in the promotion. He ended his tenure in Japan with a Kimura submission of Takuya Wada and a particularly violent stomp KO over Tatsunori Tanaka before returning stateside and joining the WEC.

World Extreme Cagefighting (2007–2008)
Condit made his debut for the WEC on January 20, 2007, at WEC 25 where he defeated Kyle Jensen in the first round via submission (Rear Naked Choke).

Condit's second fight would be for the vacant WEC Welterweight Championship against John Alessio at WEC 26: Condit vs. Alessio. Condit would win this fight in the second round, once again, by Rear Naked Choke and became the WEC Welterweight Champion.

Condit faced Brock Larson on August 5, 2007, at WEC 29.  Condit won the fight via first round submission (armbar).

Condit would next face Carlo Prater in a rematch on February 13, 2008, at WEC 32.  Condit defeated Prater via submission in the first round.

Condit faced Hiromitsu Miura on August 3, 2008, at WEC 35. Condit won the back and forth fight via TKO in the fourth round, winning Fight of the Night honors.

A rematch with Brock Larson was briefly linked to WEC 39.  The pairing was scrapped as both fighters suffered injuries and were eventually rebooked with different opponents as they transferred to the UFC.  Condit would be the last WEC Welterweight Champion before the UFC dissolved the title and division. Condit's record in the WEC ended at a perfect 5–0.

Ultimate Fighting Championship (2009–present)
Condit would make the move to UFC after the WEC buyout and he made his debut in the Ultimate Fighting Championship (UFC) organization.  He made his promotional debut on April 1, 2009, at UFC Fight Night 18 facing Martin Kampmann.  Condit lost the back and forth fight via split decision.  The fight was close enough that FightMetric ruled the bout a draw.

He was then scheduled to fight Chris Lytle on September 16, 2009, at UFC Fight Night 19, but Lytle had to drop out due to a knee injury. UFC newcomer Jake Ellenberger would step up to replace Lytle.  Condit then defeated Ellenberger via split decision to get his first win in the UFC.

Condit later had to drop out of a scheduled fight at UFC 108 against Paul Daley due to a hand injury.

Condit defeated Rory MacDonald via third-round TKO at UFC 115 in a bout that earned the Fight of the Night award. Although MacDonald seemed to get the better of the first two rounds with effective striking and takedowns, Condit came back with a more aggressive attitude in the final round, finishing MacDonald with a combination of elbows and short punches.

Condit faced Dan Hardy on October 16, 2010, at UFC 120. In the first round, Condit connected with a powerful left hook during an exchange, which dropped Hardy. Condit then landed two punches to Hardy on the ground before the referee stopped the fight at 4:27 of the first round. This victory made Condit the first and to date only man to defeat Hardy by way of KO and also earned him Knockout of the Night honours.

Condit was expected to face Chris Lytle on February 27, 2011, at UFC 127.  However, Condit was forced from the bout after suffering a knee injury while training and he was replaced by promotional newcomer Brian Ebersole.

Condit faced Dong Hyun Kim on July 2, 2011, at UFC 132. Condit won the fight via first round knockout (flying knee and punches) earning Knockout of the Night honors. This fight gave Kim his first professional MMA loss.

Condit was expected to face B.J. Penn on October 29, 2011, at UFC 137. However, UFC president Dana White announced at the UFC 137 press conference that Condit would no longer face Penn and instead replace Nick Diaz, who had failed to show up for any event related press appearances, and face Georges St-Pierre for the UFC Welterweight Championship at UFC 137. On October 18, 2011, it was announced that St. Pierre had pulled out of the fight due to a knee injury. After conferring with his management and UFC officials, Condit elected not to compete against a replacement fighter at UFC 137, but face St. Pierre in early 2012.  However, after Diaz defeated Penn at UFC 137, officials decided to have St. Pierre fight Diaz at UFC 143.

UFC interim Welterweight Championship

Condit was expected to face Josh Koscheck on February 4, 2012, at UFC 143. However, due to a knee injury sustained by St. Pierre, Condit faced Diaz at the event, with the winner being awarded an interim UFC Welterweight Championship. Condit defeated Diaz via unanimous decision (48–47, 49–46, and 49–46) to win the UFC Interim Welterweight Championship.

Condit faced Georges St-Pierre on November 17, 2012, at UFC 154.  Condit became only the second man to knock down St. Pierre in the UFC when he dropped him with a head kick early in the third round and swarmed him, but was unable to finish. He ultimately lost the fight via unanimous decision in a back and forth battle which earned both participants Fight of the Night honors for their performance. After the bout, St-Pierre stated Condit was the best fighter he had ever fought.

Condit was expected to face Rory MacDonald in a rematch on March 16, 2013, at UFC 158.  However, MacDonald pulled out of the bout citing an injury, and was replaced by Johny Hendricks.  While Condit was able to outstrike Hendricks significantly for the majority of the fight, Hendricks was able to score multiple takedowns in each round, earning Hendricks a unanimous decision victory.  Their performance earned both participants Fight of the Night honors.

Condit faced Martin Kampmann in a rematch on August 28, 2013, at UFC Fight Night 27. After a first round which saw Kampmann control the action with his wrestling, Condit was able to utilize his more varied arsenal of strikes for the remainder of the bout to get the TKO in the fourth round via a series of punches and knees, avenging his previous loss.  The fight also earned Condit his third consecutive (and fourth overall) Fight of the Night bonus award.

Condit was expected to face Matt Brown on December 14, 2013, at UFC on Fox 9.  However, in the week leading up to the event, Brown pulled out of the bout citing a back injury.  As a result, Condit was removed from the card as well.

Condit next fought Tyron Woodley in the co-main event at UFC 171. In round two, Woodley landed on Condit's right knee on a takedown. The referee stood the fight up for inactivity, and when Condit tried to step away after Woodley kicked his left knee, his right buckled, causing him to collapse in agony and the referee to award Woodley a TKO.  An MRI confirmed that Condit had suffered a torn ACL and partially torn meniscus which would require surgery.

After over a year away from the sport due to his knee injury, Condit returned to face Thiago Alves on May 30, 2015, in the main event at UFC Fight Night 67. Condit was successful in his return, winning the fight via TKO after the cage-side doctor ended the contest between the second and third round due to the amount of damage Alves had taken.

Condit was expected to face current champion Robbie Lawler on November 15, 2015, at UFC 193. However, the bout was scrapped from the event after Lawler suffered a thumb injury. The fight eventually took place as the headliner at UFC 195 on January 2, 2016.  Condit lost the bout by split decision.  Condit landed 198 of the 504 strikes he threw to Lawler's respective 78 of 177. Each fighter was credited with one knockdown during the fight, as Condit dropped Lawler in the first round and Lawler floored Condit in the second.  15 of 20 media outlets scored the bout in favor of Condit, 2 of 20 scored a draw and only 3 of 20 scored in favor of Lawler. Despite the controversial loss, both participants were awarded a Fight of the Night bonus award.

Consecutive losses

Condit returned to the cage eight months later to face Demian Maia in the main event of UFC on Fox 21 on August 27, 2016. He lost the fight via submission in the first round.

After a sixteen month layoff, Condit returned to the UFC and faced Neil Magny on December 30, 2017 at UFC 219. He lost the fight by unanimous decision.

Condit was expected to face Matt Brown on April 14, 2018 at UFC on Fox 29. Brown was pulled out from the fight due to a torn Anterior cruciate ligament (ACL), and was replaced by Alex Oliveira. Condit lost to Oliveira via a guillotine choke.

Condit faced Michael Chiesa on December 29, 2018 at UFC 232. He lost the fight via submission in the second round.

Condit was scheduled to face Mickey Gall on December 7, 2019 at UFC on ESPN 7. However, Condit was forced to pull from the event due to a detached retina, thus the bout was subsequently cancelled.

Return to victory
After nearly two years away from the sport, Condit faced Court McGee on October 4, 2020 at UFC on ESPN: Holm vs. Aldana. After knocking McGee down in the first round, Condit won the fight via unanimous decision.

Condit faced Matt Brown on January 16, 2021 at UFC on ABC 1. He won the fight via unanimous decision.

Condit faced Max Griffin on July 10, 2021 at  UFC 264. He lost the fight via unanimous decision.

On September 17, 2021 it was announced that Condit has retired from competing MMA.

Personal life
Condit married his longtime girlfriend, Seager Marie McCullah, in December 2010. The couple welcomed their first child, a son, in March 2010.

Business ventures
Condit partnered with Los Angeles brand Sene to launch a custom denim collaboration in November 2020.

Championships and accomplishments

Mixed martial arts 
World Extreme Cagefighting
WEC Welterweight Championship (One time, Last)
Three successful title defenses 
Undefeated in the WEC (5-0)
Fight of the Night (One time) 
Ultimate Fighting Championship
Interim UFC Welterweight Championship (One time)
Fight of the Night (Five Times) 
Knockout of the Night (Two Times)
Rumble on the Rock
Rumble on the Rock Welterweight Tournament Runner-up
Wrestling Observer Newsletter
2016 MMA Match of the Year (2016) vs. Robbie Lawler

Mixed martial arts record

|-
|Loss
|align=center|32–14
|Max Griffin
|Decision (unanimous)
|UFC 264
|
|align=center|3
|align=center|5:00
|Las Vegas, Nevada, United States
|
|-
|Win
|align=center|32–13
|Matt Brown
|Decision (unanimous)
|UFC on ABC: Holloway vs. Kattar
|
|align=center|3
|align=center|5:00
|Abu Dhabi, United Arab Emirates
|
|-
|Win
|align=center|31–13
|Court McGee
|Decision (unanimous)
|UFC on ESPN: Holm vs. Aldana
|
|align=center|3
|align=center|5:00
|Abu Dhabi, United Arab Emirates
|
|-
|Loss
|align=center|30–13
|Michael Chiesa
|Submission (kimura)
|UFC 232 
|
|align=center|2
|align=center|0:56
|Inglewood, California, United States
|
|-
|Loss
|align=center|30–12
|Alex Oliveira
|Submission (guillotine choke)
|UFC on Fox: Poirier vs. Gaethje
|
|align=center|2
|align=center|3:17
|Glendale, Arizona, United States
|
|-
|Loss
|align=center|30–11
|Neil Magny
|Decision (unanimous)
|UFC 219
|
|align=center|3
|align=center|5:00
|Las Vegas, Nevada, United States
|
|-
|Loss
|align=center|30–10
|Demian Maia
|Submission (rear-naked choke)
|UFC on Fox: Maia vs. Condit
|
|align=center|1
|align=center|1:52
|Vancouver, British Columbia, Canada
|
|-
|Loss
|align=center|30–9
|Robbie Lawler
|Decision (split)
|UFC 195
|
|align=center|5
|align=center|5:00
|Las Vegas, Nevada, United States
|
|-
|Win
|align=center|30–8
|Thiago Alves
|TKO (doctor stoppage)
|UFC Fight Night: Condit vs. Alves
|
|align=center|2
|align=center|5:00
|Goiânia, Brazil
|
|-
| Loss
| align=center| 29–8
| Tyron Woodley
| TKO (leg kick)
| UFC 171
| 
| align=center| 2
| align=center| 2:00
| Dallas, Texas, United States
|
|-
| Win
| align=center| 29–7
| Martin Kampmann
| TKO (punches and knees)
| UFC Fight Night: Condit vs. Kampmann 2
| 
| align=center| 4
| align=center| 0:54
| Indianapolis, Indiana, United States
| 
|-
| Loss
| align=center| 28–7
| Johny Hendricks
| Decision (unanimous)
| UFC 158
| 
| align=center| 3
| align=center| 5:00
| Montreal, Quebec, Canada
| 
|-
| Loss
| align=center| 28–6
| Georges St-Pierre
| Decision (unanimous)
| UFC 154
| 
| align=center| 5
| align=center| 5:00
| Montreal, Quebec, Canada
| 
|-
| Win
| align=center| 28–5
| Nick Diaz
| Decision (unanimous)
| UFC 143
| 
| align=center| 5
| align=center| 5:00
| Las Vegas, Nevada, United States
| 
|-
| Win
| align=center| 27–5
| Dong Hyun Kim
| KO (flying knee and punches)
| UFC 132
| 
| align=center| 1
| align=center| 2:58
| Las Vegas, Nevada, United States
| 
|-
| Win
| align=center| 26–5
| Dan Hardy
| KO (punch)
| UFC 120
| 
| align=center| 1
| align=center| 4:27
| London, England
| 
|-
| Win
| align=center| 25–5
| Rory MacDonald
| TKO (punches)
| UFC 115
| 
| align=center| 3
| align=center| 4:53
| Vancouver, British Columbia, Canada
| 
|-
| Win
| align=center| 24–5
| Jake Ellenberger
| Decision (split)
| UFC Fight Night: Diaz vs. Guillard
| 
| align=center| 3
| align=center| 5:00
| Oklahoma City, Oklahoma, United States
| 
|-
| Loss
| align=center| 23–5
| Martin Kampmann
| Decision (split)
| UFC Fight Night: Condit vs. Kampmann
| 
| align=center| 3
| align=center| 5:00
| Nashville, Tennessee, United States
| 
|-
| Win
| align=center| 23–4
| Hiromitsu Miura
| TKO (punches)
| WEC 35
| 
| align=center| 4
| align=center| 4:43
| Las Vegas, Nevada, United States
| 
|-
| Win
| align=center| 22–4
| Carlo Prater
| Submission (guillotine choke)
| WEC 32
| 
| align=center| 1
| align=center| 3:48
| Rio Rancho, New Mexico, United States
| 
|-
| Win
| align=center| 21–4
| Brock Larson
| Submission (armbar)
| WEC 29
| 
| align=center| 1
| align=center| 2:21
| Las Vegas, Nevada, United States
| 
|-
| Win
| align=center| 20–4
| John Alessio
| Submission (rear-naked choke)
| WEC 26
| 
| align=center| 2
| align=center| 4:59
| Las Vegas, Nevada, United States
| 
|-
| Win
| align=center| 19–4
| Kyle Jensen
| Submission (rear-naked choke)
| WEC 25
| 
| align=center| 1
| align=center| 2:10
| Las Vegas, Nevada, United States
| 
|-
| Win
| align=center| 18–4
| Tatsunori Tanaka
| KO (stomp)
| Pancrase: Blow 9
| 
| align=center| 1
| align=center| 2:13
| Tokyo, Japan
| 
|-
| Win
| align=center| 17–4
| Takuya Wada
| Submission (kimura)
| Pancrase: Blow 7
| 
| align=center| 3
| align=center| 4:22
| Tokyo, Japan
| 
|-
| Win
| align=center| 16–4
| Koji Oishi
| TKO (doctor stoppage)
| Pancrase: 2006 Neo-Blood Tournament Finals
| 
| align=center| 3
| align=center| 1:01
| Tokyo, Japan
| 
|-
| Loss
| align=center| 15–4
| Pat Healy
| Submission (rear-naked choke)
| Extreme Wars 3: Bay Area Brawl
| 
| align=center| 3
| align=center| 2:53
| Oakland, California, United States
| 
|-
| Loss
| align=center| 15–3
| Jake Shields
| Decision (unanimous)
| rowspan=2|Rumble on the Rock 9
| rowspan=2|
| align=center| 3
| align=center| 5:00
| rowspan=2|Honolulu, Hawaii, United States
| 
|-
| Win
| align=center| 15–2
| Frank Trigg
| Submission (triangle armbar)
| align=center| 1
| align=center| 1:22
| 
|-
| Win
| align=center| 14–2
| Renato Verissimo
| TKO (knees and punches)
| Rumble on the Rock 8
| 
| align=center| 1
| align=center| 0:17
| Honolulu, Hawaii, United States
| 
|-
| Win
| align=center| 13–2
| Ross Ebañez
| TKO (punches)
| Rumble on the Rocks: Just Scrap
| 
| align=center| 1
| align=center| 1:27
| Hilo, Hawaii, United States
| 
|-
| Loss
| align=center| 12–2
| Satoru Kitaoka
| Submission (heel hook)
| Pancrase: Spiral 8
| 
| align=center| 1
| align=center| 3:57
| Yokohama, Japan
| 
|-
| Win
| align=center| 12–1
| Chilo Gonzalez
| Submission (armbar)
| Ring of Fire 19: Showdown
| 
| align=center| 1
| align=center| 1:06
| Castle Rock, Colorado, United States
| 
|-
| Win
| align=center| 11–1
| Masaki Tuchhi
| KO (head kick)
| Professional No Rules Fight: Demolition
| 
| align=center| 1
| align=center| 4:35
| Albuquerque, New Mexico, United States
| 
|-
| Win
| align=center| 10–1
| Randy Hauer
| KO (punches)
| FightWorld 3
| 
| align=center| 1
| align=center| 1:27
| Albuquerque, New Mexico, United States
| 
|-
| Win
| align=center| 9–1
| Will Bradford
| TKO (punches)
| Independent Event
| 
| align=center| 1
| align=center| 1:30
| New Mexico, United States
| 
|-
| Loss
| align=center| 8–1
| Carlo Prater
| Submission (triangle choke)
| FightWorld 2
| 
| align=center| 1
| align=center| 2:51
| Albuquerque, New Mexico, United States
| 
|-
| Win
| align=center| 8–0
| Brandon Melendez
| Submission (triangle choke)
| Ring of Fire 12: Nemesis
| 
| align=center| 1
| align=center| 0:50
| Castle Rock, Colorado, United States
| 
|-
| Win
| align=center| 7–0
| Jarvis Brennaman
| Submission (armbar)
| KOTC 35: Acoma
| 
| align=center| 1
| align=center| 0:34
| Acoma, New Mexico, United States
| 
|-
| Win
| align=center| 6–0
| Brad Gumm
| TKO (punches)
| Ring of Fire 11: Bring it On
| 
| align=center| 1
| align=center| 1:11
| Castle Rock, Colorado, United States
| 
|-
| Win
| align=center| 5–0
| David Lindemeyer
| Submission (armbar)
| KOTC 26: Gladiator Challenge
| 
| align=center| 1
| align=center| 0:46
| Acoma, New Mexico, United States
| 
|-
| Win
| align=center| 4–0
| Tyrell McElroy
| Submission (arm-triangle choke)
| Triple Threat: Fight Night 1
| 
| align=center| 1
| align=center| 2:49
| Albuquerque, New Mexico, United States
| 
|-
| Win
| align=center| 3–0
| Anthony Zamora
| TKO (punches)
| Independent Event
| 
| align=center| 1
| align=center| 0:29
| Acoma, New Mexico, United States
| 
|-
| Win
| align=center| 2–0
| Tommy Gouge
| Submission (armbar)
| Reality Fighting Championships 1
| 
| align=center| 1
| align=center| 0:45
| Oklahoma City, Oklahoma, United States
| 
|-
| Win
| align=center| 1–0
| Nick Roscorla
| Submission (rear-naked choke)
| Aztec Challenge 1
| 
| align=center| 1
| align=center| 0:52
| Ciudad Juárez, Mexico
|

Pay-per-view bouts

Professional boxing record

| style="text-align:center;" colspan="8"|0 Wins, 1 Loss, 0 Draws
|-
|align=center style="border-style: none none solid solid; background: #e3e3e3"|Res.
|align=center style="border-style: none none solid solid; background: #e3e3e3"|Record
|align=center style="border-style: none none solid solid; background: #e3e3e3"|Opponent
|align=center style="border-style: none none solid solid; background: #e3e3e3"|Type
|align=center style="border-style: none none solid solid; background: #e3e3e3"|Rd., Time
|align=center style="border-style: none none solid solid; background: #e3e3e3"|Date
|align=center style="border-style: none none solid solid; background: #e3e3e3"|Location
|align=center style="border-style: none none solid solid; background: #e3e3e3"|Notes
|-
|Loss
|align=center|0–1
| Donnel Wade
|align=center|SD
|align=center|4
|align=center|
| 
|
|-

Kickboxing record

|-
|-  bgcolor="#CCFFCC"
| 2005-12-10 || Win ||align=left| Pete Spratt || Ring of Fire 20: Elite || Castle Rock, Colorado, USA || Decision (unanimous) || 3 || 3:00 || 3-1
|-
|-  bgcolor="#CCFFCC"
| 2005-04-09 || Win ||align=left| Cruz Chacon || Ring of Fire 16: No Limit || Castle Rock, Colorado, USA || KO (strikes) || 1 || 2:05 || 2-1
|-
|-  bgcolor="#CCFFCC"
| 2005-02-12 || Win ||align=left| Marcus Davis || Ring of Fire 15: Inferno || Castle Rock, Colorado, USA || TKO (strikes) || 2 || 1:03 || 1-1
|-
|-  bgcolor="#FFBBBB"
| 2003-09-23 || Loss ||align=left| Andy Souwer || Shootboxing: "S" of the World, Vol. 5 || Tokyo, Japan || TKO (low kicks) || 5 || 2:43 || 0-1
|-
| colspan=9 | Legend:

See also

 List of male mixed martial artists

References

External links
 

|-

|-

Living people
1984 births
American male mixed martial artists
Mixed martial artists from New Mexico
Welterweight mixed martial artists
Mixed martial artists utilizing boxing
Mixed martial artists utilizing shootboxing
Mixed martial artists utilizing Gaidojutsu
Mixed martial artists utilizing Brazilian jiu-jitsu
American male kickboxers
Kickboxers from New Mexico
Middleweight kickboxers
American practitioners of Brazilian jiu-jitsu
American mixed martial artists of Mexican descent
American people who self-identify as being of Native American descent
American people of German descent
American people of Austrian descent
Sportspeople from Albuquerque, New Mexico
Ultimate Fighting Championship champions
World Extreme Cagefighting champions
Ultimate Fighting Championship male fighters